Full Circle is the seventh studio album by the Dixie Dregs, released in 1994. This was their first studio album in over a decade, since 1982's Industry Standard, and the first album released under The Dixie Dregs since 1980's Dregs of the Earth, whereas Unsung Heroes and Industry Standard were released under the moniker The Dregs. It includes an instrumental cover of The Yardbirds song, "Shapes of Things". Although the Dixie Dregs have continued to be active in the years after its release, Full Circle is the last studio album by the band as of 2022.

Track listing
All songs written by Steve Morse except where noted:

Musicians
 Steve Morse - Guitar
 Dave LaRue - Bass guitar
 T Lavitz - Keyboards
 Rod Morgenstein - Drums, percussion
 Jerry Goodman - Violin

Production
 Michael Fuller - Mastering
 Nigel Walker - Engineer, mixing
 Tom Morris - Engineer, mastering, mixing
 Kimberlin Brown - Art direction
 Lesley Bohm - Photography
 Marcia Beverley - Art direction

References

Dixie Dregs albums
1994 albums
Capricorn Records albums